Ray McFall (26 November 1926 – 8 January 2015) was a British businessman and music promoter, who owned The Cavern Club in Liverpool.

References

1926 births
2015 deaths
British businesspeople
The Beatles
Music in Liverpool
Nightclub owners
People educated at St Mary's College, Crosby